Troy Levi Puckett   (December 10, 1889 – April 13, 1971) was a Major League Baseball pitcher. He pitched two innings in one game for the 1911 Philadelphia Phillies  on October 4. He attended Wabash College and later pitched in eight games for the Cairo Egyptians of the Kentucky–Illinois–Tennessee League during 1912.

External links
Baseball-Reference

Major League Baseball pitchers
Philadelphia Phillies players
Cairo Egyptians players
Wabash Little Giants baseball players
Baseball players from Indiana
1889 births
1971 deaths
People from Winchester, Indiana